The 2008 Swedish Touring Car Championship season was the 13th Swedish Touring Car Championship (STCC) season.

Drivers
These were the STCC entries for the 2008 season. Entrants with numbers 90 and above also competed in the privateer competition known as Semcon Cup. All teams were Swedish-registered.

Race Calendar

The calendar for the 2008 season were as follows:

Results and standings

Drivers' Championship

The drivers' championship 2008 was won by Richard Göransson.

Teams' Championship

Manufacturers' Championship

Semcon Cup

References

External links
STCC Official Website (Swedish)

Swedish Touring Car Championship seasons
Swedish Touring Car Championship
Swedish Touring Car Championship season